Thomas F. O'Mara (born May 31, 1963) is a member of the New York State Senate, serving a district in the Southern Tier of New York since 2010. The district is currently numbered the 58th district. O'Mara is a Republican.

Prior to serving in the Senate, O'Mara represented the 137th district of the New York State Assembly from 2005 to 2010.

Background
O'Mara was raised in Horseheads, New York. He received his bachelor's degree from Catholic University of America and later a Juris Doctor from Syracuse University College of Law. He worked as an Assistant District Attorney and County Attorney in Chemung County before becoming the Chemung County District Attorney.

He was first elected to the New York State Assembly in 2004 and represented the 137th Assembly District, which comprised all of Chemung and Schuyler County and portions of Tioga County. He served three two-year terms in the Assembly.

He is a member of the law firm Davidson & O'Mara in Elmira. He and his wife Marilyn have three children Thomas, Catherine and Caroline and reside in Big Flats, New York.

New York Senate
In 2010, O'Mara was first elected to represent the 53rd District in the New York State Senate after surviving a strong primary challenge from fellow Assemblyman James Bacalles. He defeated Democrat Pamela Mackesey in the general election and took office in January 2011.

In 2011, O'Mara voted against allowing same-sex marriage during the senate roll-call vote on the Marriage Equality Act, which the Senate narrowly passed 33-29 legalizing same-sex marriage.

Since his initial election in 2010, O'Mara has never faced a serious re-election, running unopposed in 2012 and 2014. His closest election came in 2016, when he defeated Democrat Leslie Danks-Burke 55% to 45%. He easily won re-election again in 2018.

References

External links
Official New York State Senate Website
Tom O'Mara For New York Official campaign website.

1963 births
Living people
Republican Party members of the New York State Assembly
Republican Party New York (state) state senators
Catholic University of America alumni
Syracuse University College of Law alumni
People from Horseheads, New York
People from Big Flats, New York
Politicians from Elmira, New York
21st-century American politicians